Bullhead Run is a stream in the U.S. state of South Dakota.

Bullhead Run was named after the bullhead fish.

See also
List of rivers of South Dakota

References

Rivers of Deuel County, South Dakota
Rivers of Hamlin County, South Dakota
Rivers of South Dakota